Internal Wrangler is the debut studio album by British indie rock band Clinic. It was released on 1 May 2000 through Domino Records.

Background
The band signed to Domino Records following the release of several self-financed singles. The song "The Return of Evil Bill" is a follow up to the song "Evil Bill" that appeared on the Clinic compilation album, and remains a fan favorite in live shows. The band, particularly lead singer Ade Blackburn, are superstitious and chose not to include a song on the 13th track; instead a four-second silence is heard before the album's final song, "Goodnight Georgie". This is believed to be why the subsequent albums have been no more than 12 songs long until 2010's Bubblegum.

The short interlude track "DJ Shangri-La" is an excerpt of Ludwig van Beethoven's "Moonlight" Piano Sonata No. 14 in C-sharp minor played on a highly overdriven organ, although here it is played in standard 4/4 time, while the original piano motif was in 3/4 time. The song "The Second Line" was used prominently in a Levi's Jeans television advertisement in late 2000, which then led to it being re-issued. It also features an interpolation of the song "Cavern" by Liquid Liquid.

The album cover was inspired by Ornette Coleman's 1961 album Ornette!

Track listing

Personnel
Clinic
Ade Blackburn – keyboard, melodica, lead vocals
Brian Campbell – bass, flute, backing vocals
Jonathan Hartley – lead guitar, clarinet, keyboards
Carl Turney – drums, piano, backing vocals, additional percussion

Production
Clinic – production
Gareth Jones – production

Charts

References

External links

2000 debut albums
Clinic (band) albums
Domino Recording Company albums
Albums produced by Gareth Jones (music producer)